Pohela Falgun (Pôhela Falgun or পয়লা ফাল্গুন, Pôela Falgun), also known as the first day of Spring of the Bengali month Falgun, is a festival celebrated in Bangladesh. The celebration was started in 1991 by students of Dhaka University's Faculty of Fine Arts. The first of Falgun usually falls on 13 February of the Gregorian Calendar. However, due to changes to the Bangla calendar, from 2020 onwards
Pohela Falgun is celebrated on February 14. The festival in Bangladesh also celebrated as Basanta Utsab (Spring Festival),

Etymology 
In Bengali, Pohela stands for 'first' and 'Falgun' or is the eleventh month of the Bengali calendar.

See also 
 Pahela Baishakh
 Culture of Bangladesh
 Festivals of Bangladesh
 Culture of Nepal
 Festivals of West Bengal

References 

Bangladeshi culture
Festivals of Bangladeshi culture
Events in Bangladesh
Bengali culture
Folk festivals in Bangladesh
Cultural festivals in Bangladesh